First American Scientific Corp. manufactures and sells the KDS Micronex, a patented grinder-dryer which grinds and dries materials in a single-step process without needing any heat input. It is a publicly traded company located in Abbotsford, British Columbia.

History

Incorporated in 1995, the company initially licensed the KDS (Kinetic Disintegration System) technology from Spectrasonic Disintegration Equipment Corp., the technology's original developer.  In 1999 First American Scientific Corp. purchased the patents to the KDS technology, and since then has added additional patent protection.

For the fiscal year ending June 30, 2010 annual revenues exceeded $1 million for the first time in the company's history.

On February 1, 2011 the company's long-serving Chief Financial Officer and Chairman of the Board of Directors died.  Calvin L. Kantonen had served as Chief Executive Officer and/or Chief Financial Officer since 1999 and as Chairman of the Board since 2000.

On April 22, 2015 the SEC suspended First American Scientific Corp. until May 5, 2015 because it had not filed any periodic reports since the period ended March 31, 2012.

On July 10, 2015 the company's registration was revoked by the SEC.

On August 29, 2017 the company formed Micronex Systems Inc, a subsidiary private company to improve the brand recognition of the KDS Micronex.

References

Abbotsford, British Columbia
Manufacturing companies of Canada